Mirko Majić (born 6 June 1989) is a Montenegrin handball player who plays for RK Butel Skopje and the Montenegrin national team.

References

1989 births
Living people
Montenegrin male handball players
Sportspeople from Podgorica
Expatriate handball players
Montenegrin expatriate sportspeople in North Macedonia